Thomas Townsend (born November 12, 1996) is an American football punter for the Kansas City Chiefs of the National Football League (NFL). He went to high school at William R. Boone High School in Orlando, Florida. He played his freshman year of college football at Tennessee before transferring to Florida. His brother, Johnny, is also a professional punter who played at the University of Florida.

Professional career

2020 season
In the fourth game of his rookie season in 2020, he had two punts that went 65 yards against the New England Patriots. He finished the game with an average of 60.8 yards, a Chiefs franchise record for punt average in a game (minimum 4 attempts), 47.8 yard net average. On November 1, he completed his first career pass on a fake punt against the New York Jets. The completion went for 13 yards, which resulted in a first down. In Week 15 against the New Orleans Saints, Townsend punted six times, landing three inside the 20-yard-line with a long of 61 yards, earning AFC Special Teams Player of the Week. Overall, Townsend finished the 2020 season with 52 punts for 2,339 net yards for a 44.98 average. For his rookie season, he was named to the Pro Football Writers Association's All-Rookie team.

In the Chiefs playoff game against the Cleveland Browns, he did not punt a single time for the first time in his career. It was the second time in franchise history a Chiefs punter did not punt a single time in a playoff game. The other was Jason Baker in 2003.

2021 season
In the Chiefs Week 9 game against the Green Bay Packers, Townsend punted six times with an average of punt of 56.8 yards with five being downed inside the 20 yard line. For his performance, he was named AFC Special Teams player of the week. The following week, he completed his second career pass on a fake punt for 16 yards. After kicking six punts inside the 20, as well as completing a pass on a fake punt, Townsend was named the AFC Special Teams Player of the Month for November. He was placed on the Reserve/COVID-19 list on December 24, 2021. He was activated on December 29. Overall, Townsend finished with 37 punts for 1,746 net yards for a 47.19 average.

2022 season
For the month of September, Townsend earned AFC Special Teams Player of the Month. He earned AFC Special Teams Player of the Week honors for his Week 15 game against the Houston Texans. He finished the 2022 season with 53 punts for 2,672 net yards for a 50.42 average. He earned Pro Bowl and first team All-Pro honors for the 2022 season. In Super Bowl LVII, Townsend punted twice for 98 yards in the Chiefs 38-35 victory over the Philadelphia Eagles.

References

External links
 Tennessee Volunteers football bio
 Florida Gators football bio
 Kansas City Chiefs bio

1996 births
Living people
William R. Boone High School alumni
American football punters
Tennessee Volunteers football players
Florida Gators football players
Kansas City Chiefs players
Players of American football from Orlando, Florida
American Conference Pro Bowl players